Stanley Anderson (27 February 1933 – 10 June 2018) was an English football player and manager. The only player ever to have played for and captained all the big 3 NE teams, Sunderland, Newcastle and Middlesbrough.

Playing career
Anderson seemed set to finish his career with Sunderland, but after 400 appearances and 12 years he signed for Newcastle United for £35,000 in November 1963.

Managerial career
He succeeded Raich Carter as Middlesbrough manager in April 1966 and remained at the club until resigning in April 1973 to be replaced by Jack Charlton. In his time the club were relegated from and promoted to the Football League second division. After leaving Middlesbrough he managed in Greece for AEK Athens FC and in England, where he became boss at Queens Park Rangers, Doncaster Rovers and Bolton Wanderers before giving up management after resigning in 1981. He continued as a scout for various clubs including Newcastle.

References

External links

1933 births
2018 deaths
English footballers
England international footballers
England under-23 international footballers
1962 FIFA World Cup players
Sunderland A.F.C. players
Newcastle United F.C. players
Middlesbrough F.C. players
AEK Athens F.C. managers
English football managers
Middlesbrough F.C. managers
Queens Park Rangers F.C. managers
Bolton Wanderers F.C. managers
English Football League players
Association football midfielders